Angels and Visitations is a collection of short fiction and nonfiction by Neil Gaiman. It was first published in the United States in 1993 by DreamHaven Books. It is illustrated by Steve Bissette, Randy Broecker, Dave McKean, P. Craig Russell, Jill Carla Schwarz, Bill Sienkiewicz, Charles Vess and Michael Zulli.

Many of the stories in this book are reprints from other sources, such as magazines and anthologies.

Contents
 The Song of the Audience
 Chivalry
 Nicholas Was...
 Babycakes
 Troll-Bridge
 Vampire Sestina
 Webs
 Six to Six
 A Prologue
 Foreign Parts
 Cold Colours
 Luther's Villanelle
 Mouse
 Gumshoe
 The Case of the Four and Twenty Blackbirds
 Virus
 Looking for the Girl
 Post-Mortem on Our Love
 Being an Experiment Upon Strictly Scientific Lines
 We Can Get Them for You Wholesale
 The Mystery of Father Brown
 Murder Mysteries

External links
The Case of the Four and Twenty Blackbirds

1993 short story collections
American short story collections
Short story collections by Neil Gaiman